The Acura ARX-02a was a Le Mans Prototype constructed by Acura for competition in the LMP1 category of the American Le Mans Series.  It was Acura's second Le Mans Prototype, following their ARX-01 which competed in the LMP2 category.

Development

Unlike the ARX-01, the ARX-02 is a bespoke LMP designed entirely for Acura by Wirth Research. The original 3.4L V8 was expanded to 4 liters for more durability and drivability with the larger power developed with P1 rules.

Wirth Research developed a chassis to generate as much mechanical grip to overcome the power deficit to Diesel centric rules created by the ACO by exploiting the engine's low mass (low compared to larger Diesel engines). Rear tires are now fitted onto the front of the car, increasing the contact patch by 7%, indicating that the vehicle center of mass was more forward placed than its contemporaries.

Racing history

The ARX-02a were campaigned by two teams, de Ferran Motorsport (Gil de Ferran, Simon Pagenaud and Scott Dixon) and Highcroft Racing (David Brabham, Scott Sharp and Dario Franchitti), and made its competition debut at the 2009 12 Hours of Sebring. Scott Dixon put the de Ferran entry on pole position at Sebring ahead of all the diesels of Audi and Peugeot due to slippery but dry track conditions. However, within the first corner of the race Acura were overcome by Allan McNish in the Audi. Neither Acura finished the race due to mechanical issues and never featured as a threat to win the race, lapping at 2.5 seconds off the winning pace.

Throughout the ALMS, the Acura gained overall wins until the Petit Le Mans. In all of the races, the bigger tires took longer to warm up than most competitors resulting in position loss to the turbo charged P1 Lola's at race starts and restarts. Scott Sharp crashed heavily at Petit Le Mans and spend the next 24 hours rebuilding the car with assistance from de Ferran. At the final race at Laguna Seca, Gil de Ferran won a hard-fought battle with the Fernandez ARX-01.

In 2010, de Ferran closed shop and Highcroft was forced to abandon the car, ending the career of the ARX-02. Highcroft went back to campaigning an updated version of the existing ARX-01 for the combined LMP class in 2010.

References

External links
 Mulsanne's Corner - 2009 Acura ARX-02a

Le Mans Prototypes
ARX-02a